Hevia is a surname. Notable people with the surname include:

 Aurelio Hevia (1866-1945), Cuban colonel and politician
 Carlinos, full name Carlos Menéndez Hevia (born 1987), Spanish footballer
 Carlos Hevia (1900–1964), Cuban politician
 Chus Hevia (born 1990), Spanish footballer
 Edel Hevia (born 1977), Cuban sprinter
 Eva Hevia (born 1976), Spanish professor
 Fabian Hevia, Chilean-born Australian jazz percussionist
 José Ángel Blanco Hevia (born 1985), Spanish footballer
 Laura Mestre Hevia (1867–1944), Cuban translator, humanist and writer
 Liuba María Hevia (born 1964), Cuban singer and composer
 Ramón López (baseball),  full name José Ramón López Hevia (1933–1982), Cuban baseball player
 Sebastián Leyton, full name Sebastián Ignacio Leyton Hevia (born 1993), Chilean footballer
 Torcuato Fernández-Miranda y Hevia (1915–1980), Spanish politician

See also
 Francisco Diego Díaz de Quintanilla y de Hevía y Valdés (1587–1656), Spanish Roman Catholic bishop
 Gutierre de Hevia (??–1772), Spanish admiral
 Hevia (born 1967), Spanish player